The 1896 USC Methodists football team was an American football team that represented the University of Southern California during the 1896 college football season.  The team competed as an independent without a head coach, compiling a 0–3 record.

Schedule

References

USC
USC Trojans football seasons
College football winless seasons
USC Methodists football
USC Methodists football